The 6th Military District was an administrative district of the Australian Army. During the Second World War, the 6th Military District covered all of Tasmania, with its headquarters at Hobart.

Around the start of the Second World War, the 6th Military District became part of Southern Command, along with the 3rd and 4th Military Districts in Victoria and South Australia. This required legislative changes to the Defence Act (1903), and did not come into effect until October 1939.

Units during Second World War

Headquarters
6th Military District Headquarters – Anglesea Barracks, Hobart

12th Infantry Brigade
12th/50th Battalion (The Launceston Regiment / The Tasmanian Rangers) – Launceston
40th Battalion (The Derwent Regiment) – Hobart
22nd Light Horse Regiment (The Tasmanian Mounted Infantry) – Ulverstone (disbanded 27 April 1943)

6th Field Brigade
106th Battery, RAA – Hobart
16th Field Battery, RAA – Launceston

Other units
7th Heavy Battery, RAA – Hobart
107th Heavy Battery, RAA – Hobart
6th Fortress Company, RAE – Hobart
17th Heavy Battery, RAA – Hobart
117th Heavy Battery, RAA – Hobart
36th Fortress Company, RAE – Hobart
12th Field Company, RAE – Hobart

Commanding officers
Colonel Reg Beesley (1985–1988)
Colonel Andrew Mattay (1990–1993)

References
Citations

Bibliography

 

History of Tasmania
Military districts of Australia